Acme is an unincorporated community in Concordia Parish, Louisiana, United States. Its ZIP code is 71316.

History
Acme was named for its lofty elevation. Acme is derived from Greek, meaning "high point".

References

Unincorporated communities in Louisiana
Unincorporated communities in Concordia Parish, Louisiana
Unincorporated communities in Natchez micropolitan area